Shangri-La Dee Da is the fifth studio album by American rock band Stone Temple Pilots. It was produced by Brendan O'Brien and released on June 19, 2001 by Atlantic Records. It was their last album to be produced by O'Brien and their last one before they first disbanded in late 2003.

Overview
Shangri-La Dee Da was originally planned to be a double album dedicated to the memory of Andrew Wood, but the concept was vetoed by Atlantic Records. While recording the album, the band also worked on a documentary and coffee table book. Neither was released, however, and limited footage was made available through the band's official website in the form of live performance-based music videos. Despite not selling as well as the band's first four albums, Shangri-La Dee Da was certified Gold by the RIAA and the CRIA and was a commercial success for the band.

Planned double album
In late 2000, lead singer Scott Weiland said that the band planned to record a double album. Shortly after work got underway, bassist Robert DeLeo said that goal looked realistic, stating:

"Scott's in a space right now where we're not cramming to just get a single record done — he's in a space where I think a double record is possible."

The band's label, Atlantic, was hesitant about the idea and the band eventually conceded.

Documentary and coffee table book
Chapman Baehler filmed a behind-the-scenes documentary as the band recorded the LP in their beach villa-turned-recording studio. According to Baehler, the documentary set out to be like a modern-day version of the 1970 Beatles documentary Let It Be. The film follows the band through preproduction and hammering out new songs to putting the tunes down on tape. Baehler explained that the documentary included beautiful and moody shots with either Dean or Robert playing an old organ in a secluded wing of the villa, Robert and Scott playing "Wonderful" acoustically, and some "totally awesome rock-out live stuff" in the main recording space.

An established rock photographer who had shot STP for years, Baehler was already working with the band on a coffee-table book when they approached him about the documentary. The project was Baehler's first venture into film-making; all of the footage was shot by him and his sister, Rebecca Baehler. The film and the book were planned for the release in late 2001, but were never released.

Live performances 
Most of the album's songs were seldom performed live with the album's most successful song "Days of the Week" only being performed at a handful of dates on the supporting tour for the album. However, the album's second single "Hollywood Bitch" has become a staple of the band's live set ever since their 2008 reunion.

In 2011, the song "Black Again" was added to STP's setlist, and was performed for the majority of the tour. "Bi-Polar Bear" was also performed occasionally, after the band reunited in 2008.

Four of the 13 album songs haven't ever been performed live, including Dumb Love, Hello, It's Late, Transmissions from a Lonely Room and A Song for Sleeping.

Appearances in other media 
 A live version of "Long Way Home" appears on some foreign copies of the band's 2003 Greatest Hits album Thank You.
 A studio version of "Wonderful" with an edited crowd noise appears on The Family Values Tour 2001 compilation album, which features Chester Bennington of Linkin Park.

Track listing
All lyrics written by Scott Weiland, except "Hollywood Bitch" by Weiland and Robert DeLeo.

Personnel
Scott Weiland – lead vocals, keyboards (tracks 2,8,9)
Dean DeLeo – guitar
Robert DeLeo – bass, backing vocals, percussion (tracks 4,5, 7), guitar (tracks 4,5), acoustic guitar (tracks 5,7,12), keyboards (tracks 5,7), piano (track 6), autoharp (track 10), electric sitar (track 11)
Eric Kretz – drums, percussion (tracks 4,9,10,12), keyboards (track 5), banjo (track 10)

Additional personnel
Brendan O'Brien – producer, mixing, keyboards (tracks 2,6,7,10), percussion (tracks 2,4,8,11)
Nick DiDia – recording engineer
Doug Grean – engineer
Billy Bowers – engineer
Karl Egsieker – recording, mix assistant
Ryan Williams – mix assistant
Bob Ludwig – mastering
Erin Haley, Cheryl Mondello – production coordinators
Gregory Sylvester – art direction
Chapman Baehler – art direction, photography

Charts

Weekly charts

Year-end charts

Singles 
Singles - Billboard (North America)

Certifications

References

External links
 

2001 albums
Albums produced by Brendan O'Brien (record producer)
Atlantic Records albums
Stone Temple Pilots albums